Borsos is a surname. Notable people with the surname include:

Attila Borsos (born 1966), Hungarian handball player
Gábor Borsos (born 1991), Hungarian tennis player
József Borsos (1821–1883), Hungarian portrait painter and photographer
Miklós Borsos (1906–1990), Hungarian sculptor and medallist
Phillip Borsos (1953–1995), Canadian film director and film producer
Tamás Borsos (1566–after 1633), Hungarian politician and diplomat
Tamás Borsos (born 1990), Hungarian handball player

See also 
 Borso